The Miss Ecuador 2006 was on March 16, 2006. There were 16 candidates for the national title. As Miss Ecuador 2006 was elected Catalina López, she was crowned by Ximena Zamora from Pichincha. The winner represented Ecuador at Miss Universe 2006.

Results

Placements

Special awards

Contestants

Notes

Returns

Last compete in:

2000
 Loja
2004
 Azuay
 El Oro
 Esmeraldas
 Los Ríos

Withdraws

 Carchi
 Galápagos

External links
http://www.bellezavenezolana.net/news/2006/Marzo/20060317.htm
http://www.cuencanos.com/fotos/detallesfotoporid.php?Id_Foto=5880
https://web.archive.org/web/20081007085941/http://www.enlacespanama.com/missecuador2006.html

Miss Ecuador
2006 beauty pageants
Beauty pageants in Ecuador
2006 in Ecuador